The Manawatu Turbos are the Air New Zealand Cup team representing the Manawatu Rugby Union.

2009 ANZC Squad

Pre Season

2009 Air New Zealand Cup
Sport in Manawatū-Whanganui